Pinto Valley is a basin in the Black Mountains of Clark County, Nevada. 

Wilderness
Established in 2002 by the U.S. Congress, the Pinto Valley Wilderness protects the valleys and hills in this northern shore section of Lake Mead National Recreation Area. The 39,173 acre desert wilderness area includes Guardian Peak and is managed by the National Park Service. It is bordered by the Jimbilnan Wilderness to the east.

References

External links
Pinto Valley Wilderness - NPS
Pinto Valley Wilderness - Friends of Nevada Wilderness

Landforms of Clark County, Nevada
Basins of Nevada